This is a list of leaders of the opposition party in the Nova Scotia Legislature, both as a colony and a Province of Canada. Since 1928, when its upper house, the Legislative Council of Nova Scotia was abolished, the province has had a unicameral  parliamentary government.  From Confederation, however, Nova Scotia has exclusively followed the modern Westminster convention whereby the leader of the opposition is the leader of the party that controls the second most seats in the House of Assembly.

Leaders of the opposition of the colony of Nova Scotia (1848–1867)

Leaders of the opposition of the Province of Nova Scotia, since Confederation (1867–present)

Opposition Leaders
Opposition Leaders